Club Deportivo Atlético Paso is a Spanish football team based in El Paso, in the autonomous community of Canary Islands. Founded on 17 June 1952, it plays in Tercera División RFEF – Group 12, holding home matches at Campo Municipal de El Paso, with a capacity of 5,000 people.

Season to season

6 seasons in Tercera División
1 season in Tercera División RFEF

References

External links
 
Soccerway team profile

Football clubs in the Canary Islands
Sport in La Palma
Association football clubs established in 1952
1952 establishments in Spain